Courtney Rogers (born December 26, 1958 in Honolulu, Hawaii) is an American politician and a former Republican member of the Tennessee House of Representatives, representing District 45 from 2013 until 2019.

On December 27, 2018, Governor-elect Bill Lee announced his intention to name Rogers to his cabinet, as his Commissioner of the Department of Veterans Services.

Education
Rogers earned her BS in international relations from University of Southern California and her MPA from Central Michigan University.

Elections
2012 Rogers challenged District 45 incumbent Representative Debra Maggart in the August 2, 2012 Republican Primary, winning with 4,646 votes (57.4%) and won the November 6, 2012 General election with 19,972 votes (73.4%) against Democratic nominee Jeanette Jackson.

Community involvement
Rogers is a colonel in the Tennessee State Guard.

References

External links
Official page at the Tennessee General Assembly

Courtney Rogers at Ballotpedia
Courtney Rogers at OpenSecrets

1958 births
Living people
Central Michigan University alumni
Republican Party members of the Tennessee House of Representatives
People from Honolulu
People from Goodlettsville, Tennessee
United States Air Force officers
USC School of International Relations alumni
Women state legislators in Tennessee
Women in the United States Air Force
21st-century American politicians
21st-century American women politicians